GNU LibreDWG is a software library programmed in C to manage DWG computer files, native proprietary format of computer-aided design software AutoCAD. It aims to be a free software replacement for the OpenDWG libraries. The project is managed by the Free Software Foundation (FSF).

Motivation 
The proprietary format DWG is currently the most used file format in CAD, becoming a de facto standard, without other alternative extended, forcing many users to use this software in a dominant position on the part of the owner company Autodesk.

There did exist the OpenDWG library (later named "Teigha"), to access and manipulate data stored in DWG format, which is developed by reverse engineering by an association of manufacturers of CAD software with the intention of supporting their products. As OpenDWG's license does not allow the usage in free software projects, the FSF created a free alternative to OpenDWG.

History 
GNU LibreDWG is based on the LibDWG library, originally written by Rodrigo Rodrigues da Silva and Felipe Correa da Silva Sanches and licensed as GPLv2 around 2005.
In July 2010 the FSF noted the creation of an alternative to the OpenDWG library as one of 13 "high priority projects".

GPLv3 controversies 
In 2009 a license update of LibDWG/LibreDWG to the version 3 of the GNU GPL, made it impossible for the free software projects LibreCAD and FreeCAD to use LibreDWG legally.

Many projects voiced their unhappiness about the GPLv3 license selection for LibreDWG, such as FreeCAD, LibreCAD, Assimp, and Blender. Some suggested the selection of a license with a broader license compatibility, for instance the MIT, BSD, or LGPL 2.1.

A request went to the FSF to relicense GNU LibreDWG as GPLv2, which was rejected in 2012.

Refork 
The project was stalled for a few years starting in 2011; this stall occurred for various reasons, including lack of volunteers, licensing issues and programmer motivation. In September 2013, the original project on which LibreDWG is based, LibDWG, announced that it was reactivating, re-forking its code from LibreDWG. A GPLv2 licensed alternative is the libdxfrw project, which can read simple DWGs. 
The LibreDWG project has resumed active development, including the addition of more recent .dwg and .dxf formats with version 0.5 in June of 2018. The most recent release as of November 2020, version 0.12.5 includes read support for all DWG formats r13+, write support for r2000 DWG and read/write support for all r13+ DXF versions. The upcoming 0.13 release will support reading all existing DWG versions.

References

External links 
 
 Project wiki

Computer file formats
Computer-aided design